Twin Towers may refer to:

Architecture

Buildings

North America
 World Trade Center (1973–2001), New York City
 Twin Towers Correctional Facility, Los Angeles, California

Europe
 Deutsche Bank Twin Towers, Frankfurt, Germany
 Twin Towers, Wembley, part of the original Wembley Stadium, London
 Tours Société Générale, Paris, France

Asia
 Petronas Twin Towers, Kuala Lumpur, Malaysia
 Taipei Twin Towers, Taipei, Taiwan
 Panhsin Twin Towers, New Taipei, Taiwan
 Kaohsiung Twin Towers, Kaohsiung, Taiwan
 Salcedo Park Twin Towers, Makati, Philippines
 Guangzhou Twin Towers, Guangzhou, China
 Shimao Cross-Strait Plaza, Xiamen, China. Nicknamed "Xiamen Twin Towers"
 Al Kazim Twin Towers, Dubai, United Arab Emirates
 Twin Towers (Ramat Gan), two identical office buildings in Ramat Gan, Israel

Previously proposed buildings
 Broadway Corridor Twin Towers, a 2017 skyscraper plan for Portland, Oregon
 Old Chicago Main Post Office Twin Towers, a 2011 skyscraper plan for Chicago, Illinois
Twin Towers 2, a 2004 skyscraper plan for New York City

Architectural designs
 Twin Tower, a 1970s Hong Kong architectural design

Film
 9/11: The Twin Towers, a 2006 television special documentary film
 Twin Towers (film), a 2002 Oscar-winning documentary

Sports
 Twin Towers (Houston Rockets), front court consisting of Ralph Sampson and Hakeem Olajuwon
 Twin Towers (San Antonio Spurs), front court consisting of Tim Duncan and David Robinson
 Twin Towers (professional wrestling), a former professional wrestling tag team consisting of Akeem and the Big Boss Man
 The Twin Towers, another former professional wrestling tag team consisting of Lex Luger and Barry Windham

See also
 :Category:Twin towers
 The Two Towers (disambiguation)
 List of tallest twin buildings and structures in the world

Buildings and structures disambiguation pages